The Institute of Hydrology, Meteorology and Environmental Studies, also known by its acronym in Spanish, IDEAM, is a government agency of the Ministry of Environment and Sustainable Development of Colombia. It is in charge of producing and managing the scientific and technical information on the environment of Colombia, and its territorial composition. The IDEAM also serves as the Colombian institute of meteorology and studies the climate of Colombia. The agency is currently led by the Director General, forestry engineer Yolanda González Hernandez. González Hernández is a specialist in Geographic Information Systems with a Masters in Meteorology Sciences from the National University of Colombia, and is the first woman to lead the agency.

Creation 
It was created on December 22, 1993, when Congress passed Law 99 of 1993, replacing the Colombian Institute of Hydrology, Meteorology, and Land Management (Instituto Colombiano de Hidrología, Meteorología y Adecuación de Tierras - HIMAT), and it officially started functioning on March 1, 1995.

Role 

The IDEAM is in charge of gathering and handling specialized information about the different ecosystems found in Colombia; it also establishes technical parameters to promote an adequate use of land use and planning

The institute is charged with obtaining, analyzing, processing and divulging information pertaining to hydrology, hydrogeology, meteorology, and geography of biophysical, geomorphological aspects, and the vegetation and land area to improve the use and care  of the biophysical resources or the country.

The IDEAM also manages the operation and location of the meteorological and hydrological bases within the country, in order to collect information, forecasts, alerts and advice on the behavior of the climate to the population. It is in charge of monitoring the country's biophysical resources on issues related to their contamination and degradation, crucial for decisions made by environmental authorities. It also functions as the entity that fulfills the task of the Institute of Meteorology for the study of climate.

References

Environmental studies institutions in Colombia
Ministry of Environment and Sustainable Development (Colombia)
Government agencies of Colombia
Governmental meteorological agencies in South America
Environment of Colombia
1993 establishments in Colombia
Government agencies established in 1993
Scientific organizations established in 1993
Earth sciences organizations
Research institutes in Colombia